The 2021–22 Ranji Trophy was the 87th season of the Ranji Trophy, the premier first-class cricket tournament in India. It was contested by 38 teams, divided into eight groups, with four teams in Group A. All the Group A league matches took place in Rajkot. The tournament was announced by the Board of Control for Cricket in India (BCCI) on 3 July 2021. Madhya Pradesh won Group A to progress to the knockout stage of the tournament.

Points table

Fixtures

Round 1

Round 2

Round 3

References

Ranji Trophy seasons